Antero Simo Tapani Kivelä (born 26 December 1955) is a retired Finnish ice hockey goaltender. After his playing career, Kivelä coached several ice hockey, rinkball and ringette teams in Finland. Kivelä is also member of the city council in Pori for the Left Alliance.

Kivelä played his entire career for Ässät Pori. He made 58 appearances in the Finland national team and took part at the 1980 Winter Olympics in Lake Placid. Kivelä is also the chairman of women's soccer club NiceFutis.

Coaching career
After his playing career in ice hockey, Kivelä went on to coach in various sports.

Rinkball

Kivelä coached  in rinkball.

Ice hockey

Kivelä coached , Närpes Kraft, Jokipojat, and Porin Ässät (league A and B) in ice hockey.

Ringette

Kivelä coached ringette from 1989 to 2015. He was a head coach in the Finnish national ringette league, for the  ringette club for more than ten seasons.

Sources 
International Hockey Database

References 

1955 births
Living people
Sportspeople from Pori
Ässät players
Finnish ice hockey goaltenders
Ice hockey players at the 1980 Winter Olympics
Left Alliance (Finland) politicians
Olympic ice hockey players of Finland
Ringette coaches
Ringette